The 1938 PGA Championship was the 21st PGA Championship, held July 10–16 at Shawnee Country Club in Smithfield Township, Pennsylvania.

Then a match play championship, Paul Runyan won his second PGA Championship, defeating the favored Sam Snead  Nicknamed "Little Poison," Runyan was one of the shorter hitters on tour, while Snead was one of the longest. Runyan was five holes up after the morning round, then needed just eleven holes to finish off Snead, the largest victory margin ever in the match play finals of the PGA Championship. Snead won only one of the 29 holes, the 24th, which Runyan bogeyed. Runyan's victory four years earlier in 1934 took 38 holes to decide.

Two-time defending champion Denny Shute lost in the third round to semifinalist Jimmy Hines.

The course, now The Shawnee Inn & Golf Resort, is on an island in the Delaware River, east of East Stroudsburg, Pennsylvania.

Format
The match play format at the PGA Championship in 1938 called for 12 rounds (216 holes) in seven days:
 Sunday and Monday – 36-hole stroke play qualifier, 18 holes per day;
defending champion Denny Shute and top 63 professionals advanced to match play
 Tuesday – first two rounds, 18 holes each
 Wednesday – third round – 36 holes
 Thursday – quarterfinals – 36 holes
 Friday – semifinals – 36 holes
 Saturday – final – 36 holes

Past champions in the field

Final results
Saturday, July 16, 1938

Source:

Final eight bracket

Final match scorecards
Morning

Afternoon

Source:

Video
You Tube – 1938 PGA Championship final

References

External links
PGA Championship Media Guide 2015
PGA.com – 1938 PGA Championship

PGA Championship
Golf in Pennsylvania
PGA Championship
PGA Championship
PGA Championship
PGA Championship